The 1910 season in Swedish football, starting January 1910 and ending December 1910:

Honours

Official titles

Competitions

Promotions, relegations and qualifications

Promotions

Relegations

Domestic results

Svenska Serien 1910

Stockholmsserien klass I 1910

Stockholmsserien klass II 1910

Svenska Mästerskapet 1910 
Final

Corinthian Bowl 1910 
Final

Kamratmästerskapen 1910 
Final

Wicanderska Välgörenhetsskölden 1910 
Final

National team results 

 Sweden: Erik Alstam - Erik Lavass, Jacob Levin - Bertil Nordenskjöld, Sixten Öberg, Thor Ericsson - Herman Myhrberg, Sven Landberg, Ivar Friberg, Karl Gustafsson, Samuel Lindqvist.

National team players in season 1910

Notes

References 
Print

Online

 
Seasons in Swedish football